Kilmaluag (meaning St. Moluag's Cell, Church or Chapel) is a township made up of several small settlements on the most northerly point of the Trotternish peninsula of the Isle of Skye, Scotland. Kilmaluag is within the parish of Kilmuir.

The settlements within the township include Balmacqueen (Gaelic: Macqueen's Place), Kendram (Gaelic: Head of the Ridge), Connista (Norse: High Farm), Aird (Gaelic: Point or Promontory) and Solitote (Gaelic: Ruin Hill).

The Kilmaluag also gives its name to a Jurassic geological formation, the Kilmaluag Formation. This limestone and sandstone formation is Bathonian in age, and outcrops in the harbour of the village and in several other locations on Skye.

References

External links

 Gazetteer for Scotland - Kilmaluag

Populated places in the Isle of Skye